Nathaniel Bacon (1802–1869) was a member of the Michigan Supreme Court from 1855 to 1857.

Bacon was born at Ballston Spa, New York. He graduated from Union College in 1824.  He was admitted to the bar in 1827 and in 1828 opened law offices in Rochester, New York.  In 1833 he moved to Niles, Michigan. Bacon served as a prosecutor and a probate judge before he became a Supreme Court Judge.

In 1855 Bacon was appointed as judge of the second circuit, also making him part of the Michigan Supreme Court. The court was reorganized in 1858, and Bacon was retained as justice of the Second Circuit but not on the Supreme Court. He was still serving on the second circuit at the time of his death.

Sources
Biography of Bacon at MI Court History

People from Ballston Spa, New York
1802 births
Union College (New York) alumni
1869 deaths
Justices of the Michigan Supreme Court
19th-century American judges
19th-century American lawyers